Emanuel Leaks, Jr. (born November 27, 1945) is an American former professional basketball player.

Born in Cleveland, Ohio, Leaks was a 6'8" forward/center who played at Niagara University from 1965 to 1968. He averaged 17.3 points and 15.1 rebounds per game over his collegiate career, and pulled down 30 rebounds in a 1966 game against Syracuse University.

Leaks was selected by the Detroit Pistons with the 20th pick of the 1968 NBA draft, but he began his professional career in the American Basketball Association, where he played four seasons as a member of the Kentucky Colonels, New York Nets, Dallas / Texas Chaparrals, Utah Stars, and Floridians. He averaged 13.5 points and 9.9 rebounds per game during his stint in the ABA, which ended in 1972 in the wake of salary disputes with the Floridians. From 1972 to 1974, Leaks played in the NBA as a member of the Philadelphia 76ers and Capital Bullets, averaging 8.3 points and 6.8 rebounds per game.

References

1945 births
Living people
American men's basketball players
Basketball players from Cleveland
Capital Bullets players
Centers (basketball)
Dallas Chaparrals players
Detroit Pistons draft picks
Kentucky Colonels players
Miami Floridians players
New York Nets players
Niagara Purple Eagles men's basketball players
Parade High School All-Americans (boys' basketball)
Philadelphia 76ers players
Power forwards (basketball)
Texas Chaparrals players
Utah Stars players